The following is a partial chronological list of movies set in the Southern United States:

1890s
 Down in Dixie, 1898
 Loading a Mississippi Steamboat, 1898
 Way Down South, 1898

1900s
 Arrival of Rex, 1902
 Mardi Gras Parade, 1902
 In Old Kentucky, 1909

1910s
 The Girl Spy Before Vicksburg, 1911
 A Gentleman from Mississippi, 1914
 The Birth of a Nation, 1915
 The Coward, 1915
 Uncle Tom's Cabin, 1918
 Almost a Husband, 1919
 John Petticoats, 1919

1920s
 The Copperhead, 1920
 Huckleberry Finn, 1920
 Tol'able David, 1921
 Our Hospitality, 1923
 The White Rose, 1923
 America, 1924
 The General, 1926
 Court Martial, 1928
 Hallelujah, 1929
 Show Boat, 1929

1930s

 Abraham Lincoln, 1930
 Tol'able David, 1930
 Huckleberry Finn, 1931 
 Secret Service, 1931 
 I Am a Fugitive from a Chain Gang, 1932
 The Cabin in the Cotton, 1932
 The Wet Parade, 1932 
 The Story of Temple Drake, 1933
 Bed of Roses, 1933
 Belle of the Nineties, 1934
 It Happened One Night, 1934
 Judge Priest, 1934
 Operator 13, 1934
 The World Moves On, 1934
 The Little Colonel, 1935
 The Littlest Rebel, 1935
 Naughty Marietta, 1935
 So Red the Rose, 1935
 Steamboat Round the Bend, 1935
 General Spanky, 1936
 The Green Pastures, 1936
 Hearts in Bondage, 1936
 The Prisoner of Shark Island, 1936
 Show Boat, 1936
 They Won't Forget, 1937
 The Buccaneer, 1938
 The Cowboy and the Lady, 1938
 Jezebel, 1938
 Kentucky, 1938
 The Adventures of Huckleberry Finn, 1939
 The Cat and the Canary, 1939
 Gone with the Wind, 1939
 Man of Conquest, 1939
 Zenobia, 1939

1940s

 The Howards of Virginia, 1940
 Virginia City, 1940 
 Belle Starr, 1941
 The Little Foxes, 1941
 Sergeant York, 1941
 Swamp Water, 1941
 Tobacco Road, 1941
 The Loves of Edgar Allan Poe, 1942
 Reap the Wild Wind, 1942
 Tennessee Johnson, 1942
 Son of Dracula, 1943
 The Adventures of Mark Twain, 1944
 Christmas Holiday, 1944
 Go Down, Death!, 1944
 The Mummy's Curse, 1944
 Wilson, 1944
 The Bride Wore Boots, 1945
 Leave Her to Heaven, 1945
 The Jolson Story, 1946
 Song of the South, 1946
 The Yearling, 1946
 Dead Reckoning, 1947
 Another Part of the Forest, 1948
 Key Largo, 1948
 Louisiana Story, 1948
 Moonrise, 1948
 A Southern Yankee, 1948
 All the King's Men, 1949
 The Fighting Kentuckian, 1949
 Intruder in the Dust, 1949
 Pinky, 1949
 South of St. Louis, 1949

1950s

 The Glass Menagerie, 1950
 Panic in the Streets, 1950
 Adventures of Captain Fabian, 1951
 Drums in the Deep South, 1951
 I'd Climb the Highest Mountain, 1951
 Show Boat, 1951
 A Streetcar Named Desire, 1951
 Lure of the Wilderness, 1952
 The Member of the Wedding, 1952
 Ruby Gentry, 1952
 Stars and Stripes Forever, 1952
 The Story of Will Rogers, 1952
 Bright Road, 1953
 Captain John Smith and Pocahontas, 1953
 The Mississippi Gambler, 1953
 The President's Lady, 1953
 Seminole, 1953
 The Sun Shines Bright, 1953
 Carmen Jones, 1954
 The Night of the Hunter, 1955 
 The Phenix City Story, 1955
 Prince of Players, 1955
 Queen Bee, 1955
 Baby Doll, 1956
 Giant, 1956
 The Great Locomotive Chase, 1956
 The Kettles in the Ozarks, 1956
 The Searchers, 1956
 April Love, 1957
 Band of Angels, 1957
 Drango, 1957
 A Face in the Crowd, 1957
 Old Yeller, 1957
 Tammy and the Bachelor, 1957
 The Three Faces of Eve, 1957
 The Buccaneer, 1958
 Cat on a Hot Tin Roof, 1958
 The Defiant Ones, 1958
 God's Little Acre, 1958
 King Creole, 1958
 The Long, Hot Summer, 1958
 No Time for Sergeants, 1958
 Thunder Road, 1958
 Wind Across the Everglades, 1958
 The Alligator People, 1959
 Attack of the Giant Leeches, 1959
 A Hole in the Head, 1959
 The Horse Soldiers, 1959
 John Paul Jones, 1959
 Porgy and Bess, 1959
 The Sound and the Fury, 1959
 Suddenly, Last Summer, 1959

1960s

 The Adventures of Huckleberry Finn, 1960
 The Alamo, 1960
 The Fugitive Kind, 1960
 Inherit the Wind, 1960
 The Jailbreakers, 1960
 Where the Boys Are, 1960
 Wild River, 1960
 Angel Baby, 1961
 Claudelle Inglish, 1961
 The Dead One, 1961
 Sanctuary, 1961
 Summer and Smoke, 1961
 Tammy Tell Me True, 1961
 Wild in the Country, 1961
 Airborne,  1962 
 Cape Fear, 1962
 Follow That Dream, 1962
 The Intruder, 1962
 The Miracle Worker, 1962
 Period of Adjustment, 1962
 The Streets of Greenwood, 1962
 Sweet Bird of Youth, 1962
 To Kill a Mockingbird, 1962
 Walk on the Wild Side, 1962
 Flipper, 1963
 Gone Are the Days!, 1963
 Soldier in the Rain, 1963
 Blood Feast, 1963
 Toys in the Attic, 1963
 Black Like Me, 1964
 Flipper's New Adventure, 1964
 Goldfinger, 1964
 Hush… Hush, Sweet Charlotte, 1964
 Kissin' Cousins, 1964
 Two Thousand Maniacs!, 1964
 The Cincinnati Kid, 1965
 Shenandoah, 1965
 The Black Klansman, 1966
 Birds Do It,  1966
 The Chase
 Frankie and Johnny, 1966
 This Property Is Condemned, 1966
 Clambake, 1967
 The Gruesome Twosome, 1967
 Cool Hand Luke, 1967
 The Flim-Flam Man, 1967
 Hotel, 1967
 Bonnie and Clyde, 1967
 Hurry Sundown, 1967
 In the Heat of the Night, 1967
 Reflections in a Golden Eye, 1967
 Finian's Rainbow, 1968
 The Heart Is a Lonely Hunter, 1968
 The Devil's 8, 1969
 The Wild Bunch, 1969
 Easy Rider, 1969
 The Reivers, 1969
 True Grit, 1969

1970s

 I Walk the Line, 1970
 Last of the Mobile Hot Shots, 1970
 The Liberation of L.B. Jones, 1970
 The Moonshine War, 1970
 Brewster McCloud, 1970
 Suppose They Gave a War and Nobody Came, 1970
 ...tick...tick...tick..., 1970
 WUSA, 1970
 The Beguiled, 1971
 Fantasia Among the Squares, 1971
 The Last Picture Show, 1971
 Swamp Girl, 1971
 The Tender Warrior, 1971
 Goodbye Uncle Tom, 1971
 Boxcar Bertha, 1972
 The Getaway, 1972
 Deliverance, 1972
 Fear Is the Key, 1972
 Frogs, 1972
 The Legend of Boggy Creek, 1972
 No Drums, No Bugles, 1972
 Sounder, 1972
 Tomorrow, 1972
 Welcome Home Soldier Boys, 1972
 The Last American Hero, 1973
 Live and Let Die, 1973
 Walking Tall, 1973
 White Lightning, 1973
 The Autobiography of Miss Jane Pittman, 1974
 Axe, 1974
 Buster and Billie, 1974
 Conrack, 1974
 'Gator Bait, 1974
 The Klansman, 1974
 The Longest Yard, 1974
 Macon County Line, 1974
 The Sugarland Express, 1974
 Thieves Like Us, 1974
 The Texas Chain Saw Massacre, 1974
 Where the Red Fern Grows, 1974
 The Drowning Pool, 1975
 Hard Times, 1975
 Moonrunners, 1975
 Nashville, 1975
 Night Moves, 1975
 Return to Macon County, 1975
 Walking Tall Part 2, 1975
 W.W. and the Dixie Dancekings, 1975
 Fighting Mad, 1976
 Gator, 1976
 Ode to Billy Joe, 1976
 The Outlaw Josey Wales, 1976
 The Savage Bees, 1976
 Harlan County, USA, 1976
 The Town That Dreaded Sundown, 1976
 Squirm, 1976
 Stay Hungry, 1976
 Eaten Alive, 1977
 Rolling Thunder, 1977
 Crime Busters, 1977
 The Rescuers, 1977
 Return to Boggy Creek, 1977
 Scalpel, 1977
 September 30, 1955, 1977
 Smokey and the Bandit, 1977
 Walking Tall: Final Chapter, 1977
 Casey's Shadow, 1978
 The Great Bank Hoax, 1978
 Odds and Evens, 1978
 Pretty Baby, 1978
 Summer of My German Soldier, 1978
 The Great Santini, 1979
 Norma Rae, 1979
 The Sheriff and the Satellite Kid, 1979
 Wise Blood, 1979

1980s

 Brubaker, 1980
 Urban Cowboy, 1980
 Smokey and the Bandit II, 1980
 Coal Miner's Daughter, 1980
 Body Heat, 1981
 Honky Tonk Freeway, 1981
 The Night the Lights Went Out in Georgia, 1981
 Sharky's Machine, 1981
 Southern Comfort, 1981
 Vernon, Florida, 1981
 Porky's, 1981
 Cat People, 1982
 Six Pack, 1982
 Cross Creek, 1983
 Go for It, 1983
 The Lords of Discipline, 1983
 The Outsiders, 1983
 Scarface, 1983
 Stroker Ace, 1983
 Tender Mercies, 1983
 Smokey and the Bandit Part 3, 1983
 Rumble Fish, 1983
 Porky's II: The Next Day, 1983
 A Flash of Green, 1984
 Paris, Texas, 1984
 Places in the Heart, 1984
 A Soldier's Story, 1984
 Tank, 1984
 Cocoon, 1985
 Porky's Revenge, 1985
 Private Resort, 1985
 Miami Supercops, 1985
 The Color Purple, 1985
 Crimes of the Heart, 1986
 Down by Law, 1986
 The Texas Chainsaw Massacre 2, 1986
 True Stories, 1986
 Angel Heart, 1987
 The Big Easy, 1987
 Matewan, 1987
 Shy People, 1987
 Miami Connection, 1987
 Bull Durham, 1988
 Biloxi Blues, 1988
 Mississippi Burning, 1988
 School Daze, 1988
 Driving Miss Daisy, 1989
 Fletch Lives, 1989
 Miss Firecracker, 1989
 Mystery Train, 1989
 Steel Magnolias, 1989
 Shag, 1989
 Heart of Dixie, 1989
 Tennessee Waltz, 1989

1990s

 Leatherface: The Texas Chainsaw Massacre III, 1990
 The Long Walk Home, 1990
Wild at Heart, 1990 
 Texasville, 1990
 Cry-Baby, 1990
 Cape Fear, 1991
 Daughters of the Dust, 1991
 Doc Hollywood, 1991
 Fried Green Tomatoes, 1991
 JFK, 1991
 The Man in the Moon, 1991
 Mississippi Masala, 1991
 The Prince of Tides, 1991
 Slacker, 1991
 The Gun in Betty Lou's Handbag, 1992
 Malcolm X, 1992
 My Cousin Vinny, 1992
 One False Move, 1992
 Passion Fish, 1992
 The Adventures of Huck Finn, 1993
 The Firm, 1993
 Dazed and Confused, 1993
 Hard Target, 1993
 The Pelican Brief, 1993
 Ruby in Paradise, 1993
 The Thing Called Love, 1993
 Undercover Blues, 1993
 The Client, 1994
 Forrest Gump, 1994
 Interview with the Vampire, 1994
  Jason's Lyric, 1994
 River of Grass, 1994
 The War, 1994
 Candyman: Farewell to the Flesh, 1995
 The Grass Harp, 1995
 Just Cause, 1995
 Something to Talk About, 1995
 Albino Alligator, 1996
 The Delta, 1996
 Ghosts of Mississippi, 1996
 Heaven's Prisoners, 1996
 Last Man Standing, 1996
 Sling Blade, 1996
 A Time To Kill, 1996
 The Apostle, 1997
 Eve's Bayou, 1997
 First Love, Last Rites, 1997
 Kiss the Girls, 1997
 Midnight in the Garden of Good and Evil, 1997
 The Rainmaker, 1997
 Rosewood, 1997
 Ulee's Gold, 1997
 The Devil's Advocate, 1998
 Down in the Delta, 1998
 Hope Floats, 1998
 Shadrach, 1998
 The Waterboy, 1998
 Wild Things, 1998
 Cookie's Fortune, 1999
 Crazy in Alabama, 1999
 The Green Mile, 1999
 The Hunley, 1999
 Life, 1999
 October Sky, 1999
 Varsity Blues, 1999

2000s

 Big Momma's House, 2000
 George Washington, 2000
 The Gift, 2000
 The Legend of Bagger Vance, 2000
 My Dog Skip, 2000
 O Brother, Where Art Thou?, 2000
 Remember the Titans, 2000
 The Patriot, 2000
 Where the Heart Is, 2000
 The Accountant, 2001
 A Walk to Remember, 2001
 Children on Their Birthdays, 2002
 Daddy and Them, 2001
 Divine Secrets of the Ya-Ya Sisterhood, 2002
 Drumline, 2002
 Monster's Ball, 2002
 The Rosa Parks Story, 2002
 Sunshine State, 2002
 Sweet Home Alabama, 2002
 Voodoo Tailz, 2002
 2 Fast 2 Furious, 2003
 All the Real Girls, 2003
 Big Fish, 2003
 Cold Mountain, 2003
 Monster, 2003
 Radio, 2003
 The Texas Chainsaw Massacre, 2003
 The Alamo, 2004
 Chrystal, 2004
 Friday Night Lights, 2004
 The Ladykillers, 2004
 A Love Song for Bobby Long, 2004
 The Notebook, 2004
 Ray, 2004
 Undertow, 2004
 Walking Tall, 2004
 2001 Maniacs, 2005
 Beauty Shop, 2005
 Because of Winn-Dixie, 2005
 The Descent, 2005
 The Dukes of Hazzard, 2005
 Elizabethtown, 2005
 Forty Shades of Blue, 2005
 The Devil's Rejects, 2005
 Hustle & Flow, 2005
 Junebug, 2005
 Loggerheads, 2005
 The Skeleton Key, 2005
 All the King's Men, 2006
 Death Proof, 2006
 ATL, 2006 
 Borat: Cultural Learnings of America for Make Benefit Glorious Nation of Kazakhstan, 2006
 Déjà Vu, 2006
 Hatchet, 2006
 Facing the Giants, 2006
 Glory Road, 2006
 The Hawk Is Dying, 2006
 Miami Vice, 2006
 Talladega Nights: The Ballad of Ricky Bobby, 2006
 Black Snake Moan, 2007
 Constellation, 2007
 The Great Debaters, 2007
 Hounddog, 2007
 Shotgun Stories, 2007
 No Country for Old Men, 2007
 There Will Be Blood, 2007
 Waitress, 2007
 War Eagle, Arkansas, 2007
 Ballast, 2008
 The Curious Case of Benjamin Button, 2008
 Fireproof, 2008
 Harold & Kumar Escape from Guantanamo Bay, 2008
 Nights in Rodanthe, 2008
 The Secret Life of Bees, 2008
 Tennessee, 2008
 12 Rounds, 2009
 Alabama Moon, 2009
 Bad Lieutenant: Port of Call New Orleans, 2009
 The Blind Side, 2009
 Brüno, 2009
 Crazy Heart, 2009
 Trash Humpers, 2009
 In the Electric Mist, 2009
 Little Chenier, 2009
 Mississippi Damned, 2009
 The Princess and the Frog, 2009

2010s

 Country Strong, 2010
 Dear John, 2010
 Dirty Girl, 2010
 The Last Song, 2010
 Main Street, 2010
 Tucker & Dale vs Evil, 2010
 Winter's Bone, 2010
 The Conspirator, 2011
 Drive Angry, 2011 
 Footloose, 2011
 The Help, 2011
 Joyful Noise, 2011
 Straw Dogs, 2011
 The Tree of Life, 2011
 Beasts of the Southern Wild, 2012
 Come Morning, 2012
 Django Unchained, 2012
 Lawless, 2012
 The Lucky One, 2012
 Mighty Fine (2012)
 Mud, 2012
 The Paperboy, 2012
 Spring Breakers, 2012
 12 Years a Slave, 2013
 As I Lay Dying, 2013
 Beautiful Creatures, 2013
 Safe Haven, 2013
 Joe, 2013
 The Best of Me, 2014
 Selma, 2014
 The Longest Ride, 2015
 Free State of Jones, 2016
 The Choice, 2016 
 Masterminds, 2016
 Midnight Special, 2016
 Moonlight, 2016
 Baby Driver, 2017
 Mudbound, 2017
 The Beguiled, 2017
 Forever My Girl, 2018
 Green Book, 2018
 The Beach Bum, 2019
 Just Mercy, 2019
 Harriet, 2019

 Where The Crawdads Sing, 2021

References
 Langman, Larry and David Ebner (2001) Hollywood's Image of the South: A Century of Southern Films. Westport, Connecticut: Greenwood Press. 

Films set in the Southern United States
Lists of films by setting
Southern